Free is a studio album by Prince Markie Dee and the Soul Convention. It was released on August 11, 1992 via Columbia Records, making it Markie Dee's first album after he left The Fat Boys. Production was handled by Cory Rooney and Markee Dee himself, who also served as executive producers together with Kenny Meiselas. The album peaked at number 47 on the Top R&B Albums in the United States. It spawned three singles: "Trippin' Out", "Typical Reasons" and "Something Special".

Track listing

Charts

Singles

References

External links

1992 debut albums
Columbia Records albums
Albums produced by Cory Rooney